Sicherheit und Frieden (English: Security and Peace) is a quarterly German academic journal focusing on peace research and security policy publishing articles in German and English. Since 2004 the journal also publishes peer-reviewed articles. The current editor-in-chief is Michael Brzoska (Institute for Peace Research and Security Policy, University of Hamburg).

External links

Peace and conflict studies
Multilingual journals
English-language journals
German-language journals
International relations journals
Publications established in 1983